The 2018 LA Galaxy season was the club's twenty-third season of existence, their twenty-third in Major League Soccer.

Players

Squad information 
As the end of the season.

Transfers

Transfers in

Draft picks 

Draft picks are not automatically signed to the team roster. Only those who are signed to a contract will be listed as transfers in. Only trades involving draft picks and executed after the start of 2018 MLS SuperDraft will be listed in the notes.

Transfers out

Competitions

Preseason 
Preseason schedule announced on December 6, 2017.

Mobile Mini Sun Cup 

The schedule for the tournament was released on December 15, 2017.

Friendlies

Major League Soccer

Standings

Overall

Western Conference

Regular season 
The first two matches of 2018 MLS season were announced on December 19, 2017. The full schedule was released on January 4, 2018.

All times are in Pacific Time Zone.

U.S. Open Cup

Fourth round 
The draw for this round was held on May 24, 2018.

Round of 16 
The draw for this round was held on June 7, 2018.

Statistics

Appearances and goals
Last updated on 28 October 2018

|-
! colspan=14 style=background:#dcdcdc; text-align:center|Goalkeepers

|-
! colspan=14 style=background:#dcdcdc; text-align:center|Defenders

|-
! colspan=14 style=background:#dcdcdc; text-align:center|Midfielders

|-
! colspan=14 style=background:#dcdcdc; text-align:center|Forwards

|-
! colspan=14 style=background:#dcdcdc; text-align:center| Players who have made an appearance or had a squad number this season but have left the club

|-
|}

Top scorers

See also 
 2018 in American soccer
 2018 LA Galaxy II season

References

External links 
 

LA Galaxy seasons
LA Galaxy
LA Galaxy
LA Galaxy
Galaxy